Sheikh Ahmad bin Muhammad Al-Thani (1853–1905), was the second son of Mohammed bin Thani, the Governor of Doha (1894–1898), Ruler of Qatar (1898–1905) and head of the Ahmed bin Muhammed Al Thani branch of the House of Thani, the ruling family of Qatar. He was also the younger brother of the founder of the State of Qatar, Sheikh Jasim bin Mohammed bin Thani.

On the death of his cousin Ali bin Abdullah Al Thani, he became the commander leader of Qatar clans coalitions against the Egyptian/Albanian Midhat Pasha army.

Sheikh Jasim's abdication in favor of Sheikh Ahmad 
Multiple sources state that Sheikh Jasim did in fact abdicate in favor of his brother in 1898. In the same year Sheikh Jasim moved to Lusail with his family, and even though he considered abdicating in favor of his son Sheikh Muhammad, he soon learned that the chiefs in Qatar at the time preferred his brother Sheikh Ahmed. In a letter written by J. C. Gaskin, Esq,, Assistant Political Agent, Bahrain on 20 September 1903 to  Captain V. dkV. Hunt. Political Resident in the Persian Gulf, it was stated "after obtaining their signature [Katar Chiefs] to document to that effect, he informed the Porte, the Wali of Basrah, and the Mitassarif of Al Has of his abdication in favor of his brother, and request them to refer all matters to the latter in future, and Sheikh Ahmed has been virtually the Sheikh of Katr, and accepted as such by the people as well as the turks since 1898.”  Sheikh Ahmad verified his older brother's abdication when J. C. Gaskin, Esq,, Assistant Political Agent met him on Al-Wakra beach on Saturday 19 September 1903.

Sheikh Ahmed was noted as a clever man with a remarkable personality by the Political Agent in Bahrain at the time, when he met the Sheikh in November 1905  at his house in Al-Bida, describing him as “extraordinary”, in his letter to the Political Resident in the Persian Gulf. Prior to meeting the Sheikh, the Political Agent met with his older brother Sheikh Jasim in Lusail where he had been residing, for more than five years. Sheikh Jasim was in his eighties at the time and suffering from severe ophthalmia while being accompanied by his son-in-law Nasir bin Mubarak Al-Khalifa, which took the Political Agent by surprise as he was hoping to meet the two brothers Sheikh Jasim and Sheikh Ahmad together. The Agent described the latter incident in his letter by stating "I was disappointed at not seeing Sheikh Ahmed in Sheikh Jasim's camp as he was aware that I had expressed a wish to meet him there. It seems, however, that a certain amount of latent jealousy exists between the two brothers and the presence of Nasir bin Mubarak whom he does not like also probably contributed to keep the younger brother away."

The Political Agent wrote about his visit that took place in Sheikh Ahmad's house a few days after visiting Sheikh Jasim as he was adamant on meeting him, describing it as a hospitable visit by stating "Sheikh Ahmed received me in a most friendly style, and put me up in his guest-room, making my clerical staff and sepoys most comfortable elsewhere." He also described the Sheikh as one who possesses a partisan spirit who was popular and influential amongst his subjects. The forty five year old Sheikh at the time also appeared to possess a lighthearted personality which is evident through the statement  "Whenever a point was hard pressed against him, he would break into most infectious roars of laughter, though the causes were hard to find, and to such an extent almost to make one question his sanity. There is no doubt however that the people of Bahrein and Katar regard him as being a strong and clever man."

Death 
He was killed by his servant in Doha in December 1905. His murderer's name was Bin Mu'ammam and even though it was rumored that the murderer and his two accomplices were executed by Sheikh Jasim, this was found to be incorrect. In fact, it was claimed by the British political agent residing in Bahrain at the time that overlooked, reported on and frequently visited Qatar that a strong minority of people in Qatar believed that Sheikh Khalifa, the eldest son of Sheikh Jasim was an abetter in assassination of Sheikh Jasim's younger brother Sheikh Ahmad bin Mohammed bin Thani. After Sheikh Ahmad's death, his eldest son Sheikh Ali was considered to be appointed to take up his father's many responsibilities, but was deemed too young by Sheikh Jasim.

Legacy 
In honor of Shaikh Ahmad:

 Ahmad bin Mohammed Military College was established in Qatar in 1996 by Sheikh Hamad bin Khalifa Al Thani.
 Ahmad bin Mohammed bin Thani street was named after him.
 Ahmad bin Mohammed Secondary School for boys was established and named after him.

Despite his honorable role as Sheikh Jasim's right hand man throughout the establishment, and running of state affairs of the State of Qatar, Sheikh Ahmed is usually unmentioned during the Qatar National Day Celebrations held every year on 18 December. The overwhelming amount of evidence stating the succession of Sheikh Ahmad as ruler of Qatar after his brother Sheikh Jasim's abdication in 1898 is usually ignored by the Qatari media.

Children
 Sheikh Mubarak Bin Ahmed
 Sheikh Muhammed Bin Ahmed (1877–1975)
 Sheikh Abdullah Bin Ahmed (1880–1973)
 Sheikh Ali Bin Ahmed (1883–1931)
 Sheikh Abdelrahman Bin Ahmed (b. 1886)
 Sheikh Nasir Bin Ahmed (1892–1906)
 Sheikh Khalid Bin Ahmed (1893–1977)
 Sheikh Abdelaziz Bin Ahmed (1894)
 Sheikh Khalifa Bin Ahmed, grandfather of Abdullah bin Nasser bin Khalifa Al Thani (1896–1983)
 Sheikh Saif Bin Ahmed (1898–1991)
 Sheikh Jabr Bin Ahmed (1899–1984)
 Sheikh Ahmed Bin Ahmed (1903–1987)

References

 

1853 births
1905 deaths
House of Thani
People murdered in Qatar
Qatari murder victims
Qatari royalty
Qatari politicians
19th-century Arabs